The following is a list of Sites of Special Scientific Interest in the Inverness Area of Search.  For other areas, see List of SSSIs by Area of Search.

 Affric Cannich Hills
 Allt Tigh Cumhaig
 Ardersier Glacial Deposits
 Balnagrantach
 Beauly Firth
 Carn nan Tri Tighearnan
 Creag nan Clag
 Dalroy and Clava Landforms
 Dubh Lochs
 Easter Ness Forest
 Findhorn Terraces
 Gartally Limestone Quarries
 Glen Affric
 Glen Strathfarrar
 Glen Tarff
 Glendoe Lochans
 Inverfarigaig
 Kildrummie Kames
 Knockie Lochs
 Levishie Wood
 Liatrie Burn
 Littlemill Fluvioglacial Landforms
 Loch Ashie
 Loch Battan
 Loch Bran
 Loch Ruthven
 Longman and Castle Stuart Bays
 Monadhliath
 Moniack Gorge
 Torvean Landforms
 Urquhart Bay Woods
 Whiteness Head

 
Inverness
SSSI